These are the international rankings of Malawi.

International rankings

References

Malawi